The Manhattan Jaspers men's basketball team is the basketball team that represents Manhattan College in The Bronx, New York City, New York, United States. The school's team currently competes in the Metro Atlantic Athletic Conference.

Postseason

NCAA tournament results

The Jaspers have appeared in eight NCAA Tournaments. Their combined record is 3–9.

NIT results
The Jaspers have appeared in 18 National Invitation Tournaments (NIT). Their combined record is 8–19.

CIT results
The Jaspers have appeared in one CollegeInsider.com Postseason Tournament (CIT). Their combined record is 1–1.

Rivalries
The Jaspers' main rivals are the Iona Gaels. They also enjoy a strong rivalry with the cross-borough Fordham Rams, whom they first played in the 1911–1912 season and annually since the 1922–1923 season. Although the Rams left the MAAC for the Atlantic 10 Conference in 1990, the "Battle of the Bronx" is still played almost every season. In the most recent matchup, the Jaspers won 66–60 against the Rams on November 12, 2021.

Manhattan College leads the all-time series (57–52) as of 2021.

See also
 Manhattan Jaspers and Lady Jaspers
 Manhattan Lady Jaspers basketball
 Sports in the New York metropolitan area

References

External links